Thonburi is a former capital of Siam (now Thailand) and now a part of Bangkok. The name may also refer to:

 Thon Buri District, a district in Bangkok comprising part of the former city of Thon Buri
 Thonburi Kingdom, the period in Thai history during which Thonburi was capital
 King of Thonburi, an alternative name for King Taksin, who reigned during the period
 Thonburi Group, a Mercedes-Benz assembly plant and import distributor for Daimler-Benz products

See also

 Dhanpur (disambiguation)
 Dhanpuri, a city in Madhya Pradesh, India